Umar Akhbar bin Ramle (born 2 May 1996) is a Singaporean professional footballer who plays as a central-midfielder or defensive-midfielder for Singapore Premier League club Hougang United FC

Career statistics

Club

Notes

References

Living people
1996 births
Singaporean footballers
Association football midfielders
Singapore Premier League players